The Women's 4 × 100 metre freestyle relay competition of the 2018 FINA World Swimming Championships (25 m) was held on 11 December 2018 at the Hangzhou Olympic Sports Center.

Records
Prior to the competition, the existing world and championship records were as follows.

Results

Heats
The heats were started on 11 December at 12:27.

Final
The final was held at 20:43.

References

Women's 4 x 100 metre freestyle relay